Hissa Abdulla Ahmed Al-Otaiba is a diplomat from the United Arab Emirates who serves as ambassador to The Netherlands.  she was Ambassador to the Holy See. Al-Otaiba was born in Abu Dhabi and has lived in Egypt, North Africa, Europe, South America, and North America. Al Otaiba’s husband, Abdulaziz Al Shamsi, serves as the UAE Ambassador to Italy. Her relative, ambassador Yousef Al Otaiba, serves as the UAE Ambassador to the United States.

She earned her PhD in Business Administration from Lausanne Business School, a Master’s degree in Computer Administration from Webster University and a Bachelor’s degree in Commerce and Business Administration from Cairo University.

Career
Al-Otaiba was one of the first women ambassadors of the UAE when she was appointed Ambassador to Spain in 2008, a position she continues to hold.
As the first UAE Ambassador to the Holy See, Al-Otaiba presented her credentials to Pope Benedict XVI on May 20, 2010.

She is a member of the International Forum for Women at the United Nations.

References

Living people
Ambassadors of the United Arab Emirates to the Holy See
Ambassadors of the United Arab Emirates to Spain
Ambassadors of the United Arab Emirates to the Netherlands
United Arab Emirates women ambassadors
Year of birth missing (living people)